Crandon, Wisconsin is a city in Forest County.

Crandon may also refer to:

Places
Crandon, South Dakota, an unincorporated community in Spink County
Crandon (town), Wisconsin, in Forest County
Crandon Park, a park in Miami

People
Esuan Crandon (born 1981), Indian cricketer
Harry George Crandon (1874–1953), English recipient of the Victoria Cross
Michael Crandon (born 1953), Australian politician
Mina Crandon (1888–1941), Canadian-American spiritual medium
Royston Crandon (born 1983), Indian cricketer

Other uses
 Crandon Institute, Montevideo, Uruguay